The beginning of the succession of bishops of Basel is shrouded in legend. The first, St. Pantalus, eludes historical documentation. He is supposed to have been martyred at Cologne with Saint Ursula, who is herself difficult to locate historically.

Early history

Prince-bishops

Modern diocese

See also
 Timeline of Basel

References

 
Bishop of Basel
Bishops of Basel